Miles Away is a jazz and fusion music album by Oxnard-based hip hop producer Madlib's Jazz virtual band The Last Electro-Acoustic Space Jazz & Percussion Ensemble. It's a group of fictional members all created by Madlib. It was released early in 2010 on Stones Throw Records in vinyl and CD format.

Track listing
All tracks composed, arranged, and produced by Madlib.

 "Derf (For Derf Reklaw)" - 8:06
 "One For The Monica Lingas Band" - 6:28
 "Horace (For Horace Tapscott)" - 5:10
 "Waltz For Woody (For Woody Shaw)" - 3:57
 "Shades of Phil (For Phil Ranelin)" - 5:05
 "Black Renaissance (For Harry Whitaker)" - 6:07
 "Tones For Larry Young" - 5:15
 "Mystic Voyage (For Roy Ayers)" - 4:26
 "Two Stories For Dwight (For Dwight Tribble)" - 5:53
 "The Trane & The Pharoah (For John Coltrane & Pharoah Sanders)" - 9:23

Personnel
Credits adapted from liner notes.

 Otis Jackson Jr. – drums, percussion, arrangement
 Emil Taylor – electric bass, fretless bass
 Mary Lou Hudson – congas, tambourine
 Chuck King – fender rhodes, wurlitzer
 Teddy Davis – electric flute, percussion
 Willie Austin – guitar, harp
 Kamala Walker – organ, accordion 
 Lady Faye – percussion
 Clyde Harrison – acoustic piano
 Ahmad Miller – sitar, vibraphone
 Tanya Harrison – moog synthesizer
 Madlib – production
 Peanut Butter Wolf – executive producer
 Radek Drutis – artwork
 Kelly Hibbert – mastering

2010 albums
Madlib albums
Stones Throw Records albums